Jung Sung-hoon (born 14 September 1968) is a South Korean footballer.

Honours

Club 
 POSCO Atoms
 K-League (1): 1992
 K-League Cup (1): 1993

 Yukong Elephants
 K-League Cup (1): 1994

 Suwon Samsung Bluewings
 K-League (1): 1998

References 

1968 births
Living people
Association football defenders
South Korean footballers
Pohang Steelers players
Jeju United FC players
Suwon Samsung Bluewings players
K League 1 players